Primagama Tutoring Institution, known as Primagama, is the largest tutoring institution in Indonesia. It started on March 10, 1982, at an office in Yogyakarta. Primagama gives extra education to students from elementary and high school to gain academic success. Primagama has 300 branches across 21 cities, with more than 14,000 students and 3,200 tutors. Awards include ISO certificate 1998, Superbrand, Marketing Award, Franchise Award, and Top Brand for Kid.

History
The institution has 766 branches throughout Indonesia. Almost every year, approximately 300,000 students join Primagama. Primagama is confirmed as Indonesia’ largest tutoring organisation by MURI (the Indonesian Record Museum). Primagama is also a holding company which has 20 subsidiaries in formal education, non-formal education, telecommunications, travel agents, restaurants, supermarkets, insurance, and golf courses.

New Primagama Powered by Zenius
Zenius officially acquired Primagama by signing the memorandum of understanding (MoU) in February 2022. Through the acquisition, Primagama's name changed to “New Primagama Powered by Zenius, which was announced on Primagama’s 40th anniversary. 

Through this new brand, New Primagama Powered by Zenius launched a hybrid learning method with a two-teachers model approach that allows students in all New Primagama branches to learn virtually with one master tutor at the same time. Meanwhile, offline tutor in New Primagama branches also accompany their students, and provide additional guidelines and mentoring directly. 

This learning method has been introduced through a series of events dubbed Hybrid Edunation which was held in Surabaya in July. This event was also held collaboratively with the Deputy Governor of East Java Emil Dardak and content creator Jerome Polin.

References

External links
http://beke000.wordpress.com/2010/09/05/kisah-sukses-purdi-e-chandra-pendiri-primagama/ Story of Purdi E Chandra, founder of Primagama
http://www.primagama.co.id/main.php?hal=pengumuman&id=12 29 Tahun Turut Mencerdaskan Bangsa
http://nasional.kompas.com/read/2009/02/02/17081355/lesehan.malioboro Kompas : Primagama change paradigm
http://bataviase.co.id/node/602285 Primagama Launches Educational Website
http://konsultasi.dmiprimagama.com/event/2011/06/2/PROGRAM-KEMITRAAN-FINGERPRINT-TES-DMI.html DMI Fingerprint Test Partnership Program
http://www.antaranews.com/berita/248246/primagama-umumkan-sarana-edukasi-era-digital Microsoft Launch Educational Facilities of Digital Age
https://dailysocial.id/post/zenius-akuisisi-primagama
https://mediaindonesia.com/humaniora/477494/bergabung-dengan-zenius-primagama-perkenalkan-program-hybrid-learning
https://edukasi.kompas.com/read/2022/07/12/165150971/two-teachers-model-upaya-mengakselerasi-pendidikan-pasca-pandemi?page=all
https://surabaya.tribunnews.com/2022/07/26/gandeng-wagub-emil-dan-jerome-polin-zenius-gelar-hybrid-edunation-2022-di-surabaya

Schools in Indonesia